Weringia (minor planet designation: 226 Weringia) is a typical main-belt asteroid. It was discovered by Johann Palisa on 19 July 1882, and was named after Währing, part of Vienna, the city where the asteroid was discovered. Photometric observations
during 2008 showed a rotation period of 11.1496 ± 0.0009 hours and a brightness
variation of 0.20 ± 0.02 in magnitude.

References

External links 
 The Asteroid Orbital Elements Database
 Minor Planet Discovery Circumstances
 Asteroid Lightcurve Data File
 LIGHTCURVES AND MAP DATA ON NUMBERED ASTEROIDS N° 1 TO 52225
 
 

Background asteroids
Weringia
Weringia
Währing
S-type asteroids (SMASS)
18820719